Like Never Before is the fifty-fifth studio album by American recording artist Merle Haggard. It was released in 2004 on his own label, Hag Records.

Background
After several gospel and roots music albums, this collection boasts a more diverse musical landscape than his critically acclaimed comeback album If I Could Only Fly, ranging from the western swing of "Garbage Man" and "Lonesome Day" to the jazz-inflected "Because of Your Eyes" and the mariachi-infused "Return to San Francisco". Haggard duets with friend Willie Nelson on "Reno Blues". The album is perhaps best remembered for the song "That's the News", a scathing indictment of media culture and the Bush administration's handling of the war in Iraq in the early 2000s. In a 2006 interview the notoriously patriotic Haggard defended the Dixie Chicks after they were lambasted for their criticism of President George W. Bush.

Reception

Thom Jurek of Allmusic praises the album, calling it "meticulously crafted and arranged, full of beautiful charts and striking vocal and instrumental performances." In his review, music critic Robert Christgau only wrote "Rebel, patriot, musician, legend, populist, sentimentalist, small businessman."

Track listing
"Haggard (Like I've Never Been Before)" (Merle Haggard, Doug Colosio) – 3:22
"That's the News" (Haggard) – 2:33
"Garbage Man" – 2:56
"Reno Blues (Philadelphia Lawyer)" (with Willie Nelson) – 3:33
"The Downside" (Haggard) – 1:59
"Because of Your Eyes" (Haggard) – 3:48
"Lonesome Day" (Haggard, Colosio) – 2:06
"I Dreamed You Didn't Love Me" (Haggard) – 3:04
"Yellow Ribbons" (Haggard) – 2:59
"I Hated to See You Go" (Haggard) – 2:53
"Return to San Francisco" (Haggard) – 2:25

Personnel
Merle Haggard – vocals, guitar
Norm Hamlet – pedal steel guitar
Don Markham – saxophone, trumpet
Clint Strong – guitar
Red Lane – guitar
Doug Colosio – keyboards
Andy Kaulkin – piano
Mike Martin – harmonica
Willie Nelson – vocals, guitar
Norman Stevens – guitar
Kevin Williams – bass
Jeff  Ingraham – drums
Kenny Malone – drums
Scott Joss – fiddle, guitar, background vocals
Theresa Lane Haggard – background vocals

References

2003 albums
Merle Haggard albums